Aloha Yachts were a range of sailing keelboats manufactured in Whitby, Ontario, Canada by Ouyang Boat Works, founded by Ti Ouyang who had previously worked for Whitby Boat Works.

Boats
After producing a range of 16, 20 and 23 foot trailerable sailboats under the "Matilda" name, in 1973 Ouyang introduced the Aloha 28. Designed by Ted Brewer and Robert Wallstrom, it featured an outboard rudder.

This was followed in 1975 by the Aloha 34, also a Brewer and Wallstrom design. The Aloha 27 (also referred to as the 26, 8.2, and the 271), designed by Robert Perry, was added to the range in 1979. The Aloha 32, a sloop designed by Mark Ellis, followed in 1982 and the Aloha 30, designed by Ron Holland, in 1986.

The company also considered acting as North American agents for 41 and 47 foot yachts designed by Robert Perry to be manufactured in the Far East and sold under the Aloha-Perry name, but after trials with the prototype 41 foot model, decided not to pursue this arrangement.

All production boats featured good quality fibreglass construction and well finished teak interiors. A total of between 600 and 700 boats were constructed before the company encountered financial difficulties in a mid-1980s depression in the boat building business, and ceased trading. The boats remain a popular choice with Canadian and United States buyers and are supported by enthusiastic owners associations, the Aloha Owners Association catering to owners of 27, 28, 30 and 32 foot models and the Aloha 34 Network to owners of the Aloha 34.

Production
Boats produced under the Aloha brand are:

Aloha 28 - 1972
Aloha 34 - 1975
Aloha 26 - 1979
Aloha 32 - 1979
Aloha 10.4 - 1981
Aloha 8.2 - 1980
Aloha 8.5 - 1983
Aloha 271 - 1983
Aloha 30 - 1986

References

Canadian boat builders
Canadian brands